Fellers is a surname. Notable people with the surname include:

Bonner Fellers (1896–1973), American general in World War II
Carl R. Fellers (1893–1960), American food scientist and microbiologist
Rich Fellers (born 1959), American equestrian
Sierra Fellers (born 1986), American professional skateboarder